Farid Sabry Mansour (14 August 1933 – 16 September 2012) was an
Egyptian businessman who founded PricewaterhouseCoopers (PwC) in Egypt. Born to an Austrian Mother and an Egyptian father. He was also a Rotarian, and Chairman of the Quseir Heritage Preservation Society. President of the Islamic and Coptic Museum in Egypt, heading the renovation and restoration.

References

1933 births
2012 deaths